Coopersville is a hamlet in the town of Nunda, Livingston County, New York, United States. Coopersville lies at an elevation of 843 feet (257 m).

References

Hamlets in New York (state)
Hamlets in Livingston County, New York